Aimé Gruet-Masson (8 December 1940 – 12 July 2014) was a French biathlete. He competed at the 1968 Winter Olympics, the 1972 Winter Olympics and the 1976 Winter Olympics.

References

1940 births
2014 deaths
French male biathletes
Olympic biathletes of France
Biathletes at the 1968 Winter Olympics
Biathletes at the 1972 Winter Olympics
Biathletes at the 1976 Winter Olympics
Sportspeople from Jura (department)